Familyhood (lit. "Goodbye Single") is a 2016 South Korean comedy-drama film directed by Kim Tae-gon, starring Kim Hye-soo.

Plot
Go Joo-yeon (Kim Hye-soo) is a self-centered star actress who has always gotten what she wants: fame, money, and even good-looking young boyfriends. However, now in her 40s and with her acting career going downhill, she wonders whether she should settle down with her secret boyfriend, who is 12 years younger than her. However, the boyfriend, a rookie actor, is only interested in taking advantage of her fame, cheating on her behind her back. Discovering the truth, Joo-yeon is devastated that she has no one who she can truly rely on. So she decides to have someone definite in her life, her own baby.

She goes to see an obstetrician only to learn that she has reached menopause. While facing the depressing truth, she comes across a pregnant teenager Kim Dan-ji (Kim Hyun-soo) at the hospital. Joo-yeon makes the offer to Dan-ji that she will adopt the baby at whatever price, and will support her until she delivers. Dan-ji, who needs the money, accepts the offer and agrees to stay hidden at Joo-yeon’s home. When Joo-yeon makes a press announcement of her pregnancy, in vengeance against her ex-boyfriend, who has become a rising star, rumors start to spread about who the father is. She declares that she will be a single mom and her dignified demeanor earns her numerous jobs making her more successful than ever. Dazzled by the new phase in her career, Joo-yeon begins to neglect Dan-ji, but worse, people are now getting suspicious.

Cast
Kim Hye-soo as Go Joo-yeon
Ma Dong-seok as Park Pyung-goo
Kim Hyun-soo as Kim Dan-ji
Kim Yong-gun as CEO Kim 
Seo Hyun-jin as Sang-mi
Kim Bo-yoon as Ok Hee	
Kwak Si-yang as Kang Ji-hoon
Choi Go as Pyung-goo's child	
Hwang Mi-young as Mi-rae
Ahn Jae-hong as Han Deok-soo
Lee Sung-min as  Joo Min-ho
Kang Chan-hee as Hyun-bin
Ryu Hye-rin as Joo-yun's entertainment company's trainee
Jung Yeon-joo as Broadcasting station celebrity	
Lee Soo-kyung as Seon-yeong

Cameo
Kim Hee-chul as Broadcasting Station Idol
Hwang Seung-eon as Award Ceremony Woman

Box office 
Familyhood debuted on top of the Korean box office, opening in first place with 652,894 viewers (USD 4.83 million) over the weekend and 908,949 admissions (USD 6.36 million) over its first five days. It reached 1 million admissions on its first week. The film reached its breakeven point and has accumulated a total of 2,108,130 admissions.

Awards and nominations

References

External links 
 
 
 

2016 films
2010s Korean-language films
South Korean comedy-drama films
2016 comedy-drama films
2010s South Korean films